Andinobates is a genus of poison dart frogs from Ecuador, Colombia and Panama. It contains species formerly classified in the genus Dendrobates and in 2006 transferred to the genus Ranitomeya. In 2011 Twomey, Brown, and their colleagues erected the genus Andinobates for a group of 12 species of Ranitomeya. Andinobates frogs can be distinguished from their sister taxon Ranitomeya anatomically in that their 2nd and 3rd vertebrae are fused. They show no limb reticulation, which is present in most species of Ranitomeya.

Distribution
Andinobates inhabits the rainforests of Ecuador, Colombia, and Panama, whereas Ranitomeya is only found in the Amazonian basin.

Species 
Andinobates primarily contained 12 species formerly classified in the genus Ranitomeya. In 2013 Andinobates cassidyhornae, another species from the Andes of Colombia has been described. In 2014 another new species, Andinobates geminisae, was discovered in Panama. This brings the current total to 16 species:

References

 
Poison dart frogs
Amphibian genera
Amphibians of Central America
Amphibians of South America